The 1908 United States presidential election in North Dakota took place on November 3, 1908. Voters chose four representatives, or electors to the Electoral College, who voted for president and vice president.

North Dakota voted for the Republican nominee, Secretary of War William Howard Taft, over the Democratic nominee, former U.S. Representative William Jennings Bryan. Taft won the state by a margin of 26.23%.

With 61.02% of the popular vote, North Dakota would be Taft's fourth strongest victory in terms of percentage in the popular vote after Vermont, Maine and Michigan.

Bryan had previously lost North Dakota to Republican William McKinley in both 1896 and 1900.

Results

Results by county

See also
 United States presidential elections in North Dakota

References

North Dakota
1908
1908 North Dakota elections